Daniel Robert Rosenfield (born May 1977) is a British political adviser and civil servant who served as the Downing Street Chief of Staff from January 2021 to February 2022. Between July 2007 and April 2011, he served as the principal private secretary to chancellors Alistair Darling and George Osborne, and subsequently as a managing director for Bank of America Merrill Lynch.

Early life and education 
Rosenfield was born in Manchester in 1977, and attended Manchester Grammar School from 1988 to 1995, where he studied maths, French and German at A-level. After school, he spent a year in Israel on a kibbutz. Rosenfield's family later moved to London, where they were members of the North Western Reform Synagogue. He later attended University College London, where he read modern European studies from 1996 to 2000, specialising in German and philosophy.

Career 
Rosenfield worked at HM Treasury from 2000 to 2011. In 2005 he was partly responsible for creating a budget for the 2012 London Olympics, after it was announced that London had won the bid.

From July 2007 to April 2011 he worked as principal private secretary to Chancellors Alistair Darling and George Osborne during the financial crisis and its aftermath.

Rosenfield then left public service to join Bank of America Merrill Lynch as a managing director in investment banking from June 2011 to March 2016. The bank subsequently bid for lucrative roles advising UK Financial Investments on the sale of Northern Rock, which had been the subject of oversight by the Treasury while Rosenfield had been in office. In April 2016 he became a partner at Hakluyt & Company, a corporate strategy adviser.

Downing Street Chief of Staff 
On 26 November 2020, Downing Street announced that Rosenfield had been appointed as the Downing Street Chief of Staff, and that he would formally take office on 1 January 2021. This followed the fallout caused by the resignations of key Boris Johnson advisers Lee Cain and Dominic Cummings, and the appointment of Edward Lister as the acting chief of staff. Although Johnson had not formally appointed a chief of staff since he became prime minister in July 2019, Cummings was noted to be the de facto chief of staff until his departure.

Shortly after his appointment, in April 2021, Rosenfield was implicated in a potential lobbying scandal in relation to the proposed European Super League of major football clubs. Rosenfield met with Manchester United chief executive Ed Woodward in Downing Street on 14 April, at the height of debate about the scheme and whether it would receive support from the government, apparently also introducing Woodward to Johnson at the meeting. Rosenfield reportedly told Woodward that Downing Street would not oppose the controversial plans, from which Manchester United and Woodward stood to benefit financially. Downing Street sources subsequently denied that the scheme was discussed at the meeting. Woodward had also allegedly tried to keep the meeting secret. 

In July 2021, it was reported by The Times newspaper that Rosenfield's leadership was unpopular among some Downing Street staff members, including Nikki da Costa, the director of communications. There were suggestions that Rosenfield had failed to hold strategy meetings for political advisors for up to six months. It was additionally reported that Rosenfield did not frequently chair Downing Street staff meetings, despite his role as chief of staff, instead leaving them to his deputy Simone Finn.

It was reported in The Sunday Telegraph in January 2022 that Rosenfield had attended a cricket game three days before the Fall of Kabul, for which the UK government was criticised in its response. Downing Street did not deny the allegations but stated that "Dan was in constant contact with the office".

In December 2021, Downing Street denied speculation in a report in The Times that in December 2020 Rosenfield had attended a Christmas party in the office of Simon Case, the head of the Civil Service, when British public health restrictions as a result of the COVID-19 pandemic forbade such gatherings. Speculation has arisen that Rosenfield might be sacked by Johnson for his role in the controversy, amid further criticism that he had presided over a 'laddy' culture within Downing Street which had excluded female members of staff.

Rosenfield resigned as Downing Street chief of staff in February 2022 following the resignation of Munira Mirza during the Partygate scandal, with the intention of remaining in place until a successor is found. Two days later, Steve Barclay was announced as the new chief of staff alongside Guto Harri as the new director of communications, replacing Jack Doyle.

Other roles 
Prior to taking up his Downing Street appointment Rosenfield had from October 2016 been Chair of Trustees of World Jewish Relief, having served as a trustee since 2013. Rosenfield stepped down as Chair in January 2021 and was succeeded by Maurice Helfgott.

Personal life 
Rosenfield is married to Jessica Brummer and has three children - Rafi, Natasha and Benjamin. His father-in-law is Alex Brummer, a journalist for the Daily Mail. He is Jewish, and has described Judaism as being "central to his life". Rosenfield is a fan of Manchester United F.C.

References 

1977 births
Living people
Political controversies in the United Kingdom
Impact of the COVID-19 pandemic on politics
2021 controversies
People educated at Manchester Grammar School
Alumni of University College London
British Prime Minister's Office
British civil servants
Civil servants in HM Treasury
British special advisers
People from Manchester
Downing Street Chiefs of Staff